Javier Duren (born July 1, 1993) is an American former professional basketball player. Duren played collegiate for the Yale Bulldogs, starting from 2011 till 2015. He played the point guard position.  He currently works with Major League Baseball's St. Louis Cardinals in their baseball operations department, working as the manager of video operations.

Professional career
In July 2015, Duren was announced as the new point guard of Aris Leeuwarden. He had a career-high 37 points against ZZ Leiden on March 29. Duren eventually became the DBL scoring leader, averaging 17.7 points per game in the 2015–16 season.

On August 11, 2016, he signed with Kaposvári KK in Hungary.

On January 30, 2017, Duren signed with BC Nokia of the Finnish Korisliiga.

On October 21, 2017, Duren was drafted by the Lakeland Magic of the NBA G League. On October 31, 2017, Duren was waived by the Magic after appearing in one preseason game.

References

External links
Yale Bulldogs bio

1993 births
Living people
American expatriate basketball people in Finland
American expatriate basketball people in Hungary
American expatriate basketball people in the Netherlands
American men's basketball players
Aris Leeuwarden players
Basketball players from St. Louis
BC Nokia players
Dutch Basketball League players
Kaposvári KK players
Point guards
Yale Bulldogs men's basketball players